Croatia competed in the Winter Olympic Games for the first time as an independent nation at the 1992 Winter Olympics in Albertville, France.  Previously, Croatian athletes had competed for Yugoslavia at the Olympic Games.

Competitors
The following is the list of number of competitors in the Games.

Alpine skiing

Cross-country skiing

Figure skating

References

External links
Official Olympic Reports

Nations at the 1992 Winter Olympics
1992